Luis Ramírez (born 13 January 1948) is a Cuban gymnast. He competed at the 1968 Summer Olympics and the 1972 Summer Olympics.

References

1948 births
Living people
Cuban male artistic gymnasts
Olympic gymnasts of Cuba
Gymnasts at the 1968 Summer Olympics
Gymnasts at the 1972 Summer Olympics
Sportspeople from Havana
21st-century Cuban people
20th-century Cuban people